The 2011 J. League Cup, also known as the 2011 J.League Yamazaki Nabisco Cup for sponsoring purposes, is the 36th edition of the most prestigious Japanese soccer league cup tournament and the 19th edition under the current J. League Cup format. It was scheduled to begin on 16 March 2011 with the first matches of the group stage; however, the competition was postponed due to the aftermath of the 2011 Tōhoku earthquake and tsunami. Later the beginning of the tournament is set to 5 June, with reducing the number of matches.

The winner qualified for the 2012 Suruga Bank Championship.

Format
All 18 teams from the 2011 J. League Division 1 will take part in the tournament. Nagoya Grampus, Gamba Osaka, Cerezo Osaka and Kashima Antlers are given a bye to the quarter-final due to the qualification for the AFC Champions League group stage. The remaining 4 teams for quarter-finals are selected from other 14 teams by knockout tournaments of home and away (with away goals rule, except for goals in extra times). Quarter-finals and semifinals will be played as one match at either team's home stadium. The final will also be played as one match, but at neutral venue (National Stadium).

First, the exact date of the Final has yet to be determined and is subject to possible participation in the 2011 AFC Champions League Final of at least one of the involved clubs. Later the date is set to 29 October.

Original Format
The original competition format, which is same as the previous tournament and was abandoned due to 2011 Tōhoku earthquake and tsunami, is:
The preliminary round for the 14 teams would be played as 2 groups of single round-robin tournaments by 7 teams, where each team would play 3 home and 3 away games. The top 2 teams in each group would advance to quarter-finals.
Quarter-finals and semi-finals would be played home and away.

The draw result of the preliminary round is:
Group A
Albirex Niigata, Omiya Ardija, Yokohama F. Marinos, Kawasaki Frontale, Montedio Yamagata, Kashiwa Reysol, Ventforet Kofu
Group B
Avispa Fukuoka, Júbilo Iwata, Urawa Red Diamonds, Sanfrecce Hiroshima, Shimizu S-Pulse, Vegalta Sendai, Vissel Kobe

Schedule

First round
The first leg is scheduled on 5 June and the second leg on 27 July.

Albirex Niigata and Omiya Ardija received bye for the second round as a result of tournament draws.

|}

Second round
The first leg is scheduled on 14 September and the second leg on 28 September.

|}

Quarterfinals

Semifinals

Final

Top goalscorers

External links
 J.League Official Site

References

Cup
2011
2011 domestic association football cups